Sir Samuel Ongley (1647–1726), of Old Warden, Bedfordshire and Mincing Lane, London, was an English politician.

Born in Maidstone, Kent, he became a London merchant. In 1698 he purchased the Old Warden Estate from Paulet St John, Earl of Bolingbroke.  He was appointed High Sheriff of Bedfordshire for 1703.

He was a Member (MP) of the Parliament of Great Britain for Maidstone 1713 to 1715 and was knighted in 1713.

He died unmarried in 1726, leaving his estate to his nephew, also Samuel Ongley, who became MP for Bedford.

He is buried in St Leonard's church in Old Warden in Bedfordshire.

References

1647 births
1726 deaths
People from Maidstone
People from Central Bedfordshire District
English merchants
Members of the Parliament of Great Britain for English constituencies
British MPs 1713–1715
High Sheriffs of Bedfordshire
Knights Bachelor
Burials in Bedfordshire